Cambridge Jones (real name Paul Barrow) is a British celebrity portrait photographer. His subjects, in a series of books and exhibitions, include several British Prime Ministers, Queen Elizabeth II, and well-known actors and musicians.

Several of his books and exhibitions have involved musical themes. His first major exhibition, Face The Music (2004), at The Proud Galleries in London, featured pictures of 120 well-known faces who chose and commented on a favourite piece of music. Gallery visitors could listen to each subject's chosen track on headphones as they looked at their portrait.

Notable commissions include work for RADA (The Royal Academy of Dramatic Arts), Prince Charles’ charity The Prince's Trust, The BBC, Nelson Mandela, London 2012 (Olympics Committee), Mayor of London Boris Johnson, and Christ Church, Oxford.

In 2009 he was made an ambassador to The Prince's Trust.

Forthcoming Books & Exhibitions
Cambridge Jones’ next project is "Boris Johnson - Climate Change", an exhibition & book to accompany the launch of a consultative website intended to engage Londoners with the issue of Climate Change, and featuring 20 well-known faces and their views. Launch is scheduled for February 2010.
Other forthcoming projects include an exhibition and book on the greatest living Olympians, to mark the London 2012 games, and Talking Heads, an exhibition looking at iconic performers and their inspiration which is due to open simultaneously in four US and UK cities (New York, Los Angeles, Cardiff & London) in September 2010.

Exhibitions
 "Face The Music", Proud Galleries, London, 2004	
Portraits of 120 famous Brits who also talked about their favourite music; in the gallery members of the public could hear each subject's chosen track on headphones. 
 "OFFSTAGE", Getty Gallery, London, 2005
Exhibition to mark 100 years of The Royal Academy of Dramatic Art (RADA), featuring portraits of 100 famous RADA-trained British actors.
 "The Royal Academy Centenary Portraits Reprised", O3 Gallery, 2006
Reprise of the Offstage exhibition.
 "Persona", Theatre Royal, Brighton, 2007
Voice Portraits by synaesthetic artist Philippa Stanton and portraits by Cambridge Jones.
 "Home Time", Getty Gallery, London, 2008
Cambridge Jones (himself adopted) asked Terry O'Neil and well-known names to help him produce an exhibition where celebrities were paired with children needing adoption. 
 "Country Couture", Country Music Hall of Fame, 2009
Exhibition looking at the work of couturier Manuel and the stage clothes he designs for country music stars such as Merle Haggard, Loretta Lynn, Porter Wagoner and Dwight Yoakam.

Books
 OFFSTAGE, 2005
 Christ Church – A Portrait of The House, 2007
 Inspired By Music (for the Prince's Trust), 2009
Each portrait subject is accompanied by lyrics of a song that inspired them.

DVD
 "A Wider Sky" 2005
Collaboration with composer Adrian Munsey & Cambridge Jones using photography & music.

External links
Interview with Cambridge Jones in The British Theatre Guide.
Cambridge Jones' website.

Welsh photographers
Living people
Year of birth missing (living people)